Fadenia is an extinct genus of eugeneodontid holocephalian chondrichthyan from the Carboniferous Period of Missouri (United States), the Permian period of Greenland, and the Early Triassic epoch of Greenland and Sulphur Mountain Formation of British Columbia, Canada.

Eugeneodontida are an extinct order of Chondrichthyes. They are characterized by the presence of tooth whorls. They include iconic genera, such as Helicoprion (buzz-saw shark), Ornithoprion, Edestus or Caseodus. Fadenia is one of the few eugeneodontid genera that survived the end-Permian mass extinction event. It is one of the last surviving genera of this clade.

The first fossils of Fadenia were discovered and written about in the periodical Meddelelser om Grønland in 1932 by the Danish vertebrate palaeontologist Eigil Nielsen after studying the Upper Permian beds of Cape Stosch, in the fjord of Godthab Gulf in King Christian X Land, Greenland. He had joined at the beginning of the Three-year Expedition to East Greenland led by Danish geologist and explorer Lauge Koch. The manager of the expedition was the botanist Gunnar Seidenfaden, after whose surname the taxon was named.

References

Further reading 
 Bendix-Almgreen, S. E. (1975). "Fossil fishes from the marine Late Palaeozoic of Holm Land – Amdrup Land, north-east Greenland". In: Meddelelser om Grønland. 195: 3–38.
 Ginter, M.; Hampe, O. & Duffin, C. J. (2010). "Chondrichthyes. Paleozoic Elasmobranchii: Teeth". Handbook of Paleoichthyology. Volume 3D: 1–168. 
 Nielsen, E. (1932). "Permo-Carboniferous fishes from east Greenland". In: Meddelelser om Grønland. 86 (3): 1–63.
 Nielsen, E. (1952). "On new or little known Edestidae from the Permian and Triassic of East Greenland". Meddelelser om Grønland. 144: 1–55.

Caseodontidae
Permian cartilaginous fish
Triassic cartilaginous fish
Prehistoric cartilaginous fish genera
Fossils of Greenland